Fernanda Romero (born as María Fernanda Romero Martínez on October 4, 1983) is a Mexican actress, model and singer.  She is most noted for her starring role in the Mexican telenovela Eternamente tuya and her supporting role in the American film The Eye.

Biography
Romero began her singing career when she joined BMG's recording ensemble group, Frizzby, who began touring Central America to promote their two top ten singles. They performed for Pope John Paul II at the famous Estadio Azteca in Mexico City.

By the time Romero reached eighteen she was in ad campaigns for brands like Rock and Republic, Clean & Clear, Pepsi, Apple, and J.C. Penney.  She also appeared in magazines such as GQ Mexico, OK Magazine Espanol, Reforma and ELLE Mexico.

Romero began her acting career as host of the Univision television show Control, followed shortly by an appearance on the Telemundo telenovela La Ley del Silencio.  These led to her first film offer, a role in the film Creature of Darkness, and several more small roles.

Romero's breakout role occurred in the film The Eye.  This exposure to American audiences led to more Hollywood films, including The Burning Plain, Drag Me to Hell and Red Canvas.

In 2009, Fernanda Romero returned to Mexico to star in the soap opera Eternamente tuya.

Immigration issues
In 2010, Romero was arrested on charges of immigration fraud, accused of entering into a sham marriage to obtain legal immigrant status. She and her husband, a musician, were arrested in their separate homes, and put on trial, where she was accused of paying her groom $5000 for the marriage. She wasn't found guilty by a jury, but reached a deal and pled guilty to a lesser count, and was ordered to serve 30 days in jail. Although such a conviction is generally followed by deportation, the United States Immigration and Naturalization Service had not taken any action to deport Romero.

Selected filmography
 Film
 El alma herida (2003) – Clarita
 La ley del silencio (2005) – Virginia
 Pit Fighter (2005) – (uncredited) Conchita
 She Builds Quick Machines (Velvet Revolver music video) (2007) – Libertad
 Eternamente tuya (2009) – Antonia
 The Eye (2008) – Ana Cristina Martínez/Ling
 Drag Me to Hell (2009)
 Ready or Not (2009)
 Silver Case (2011) – Lola ....directed by Christian Filippella
 Geezers! (2012) Tiffany
 Ghost Team One	Independent	Dir. Scott Rutherford
 Mission Park (2013) – Gina
 Caveman (2014) – Alicia
 "400 Days" (2015) – Zia
 Is That a Gun in Your Pocket? (2016) – Connie
"Las Espinas del Corazón"- Televisa (2018)
 
 TV    
 County	Recurring	NBC
 RPM Miami	Series Regular	MunDos
 Eternamente Tuya	 Series Regular	TV Azteca
 Todd's Coma	Guest Star	TBS
 La Ley del Silencio	Guest Star	Telemundo
 Entourage	Guest Star	HBO
 Summer Friends	Series Regular	Sony
 Wounded Soul	Series Regular	Televisa
 Music Video
 Frankie J-And I Had You There	Main girl

References

External links
Official Site

Living people
Mexican actresses
Actresses from Mexico City
Singers from Mexico City
1983 births
21st-century Mexican singers
21st-century Mexican women singers